The 1994 PBA Commissioner's Cup Finals was the best-of-7 championship series of the 1994 PBA Commissioner's Cup, and the conclusion of the conference playoffs. The Purefoods TJ Hotdogs and Alaska Milkmen played for the 58th championship contested by the league.

Purefoods Tender Juicy Hotdogs wins their 4th PBA title with a 4–1 series victory over the Alaska Milkmen.

Qualification

Series scoring summary

Games summary

Game 1

Game 2

Down by 12 points at least twice in the first three quarters, Purefoods limited Alaska to a record-low six points in the final period. The Milkmen were up, 73-65, starting the fourth quarter.

Game 3

Purefoods held Alaska scoreless for more than two minutes while unleashing a 7-0 run. Kenny Redfield's triple late in the game dashed the Milkmen's hopes of pulling out their first victory in the series.

Game 4

Glenn Capacio missed a game-tying free throw with 3.7 seconds left as Alaska averted a Purefoods' sweep with a one-point victory. The Milkmen grabbed their biggest lead in the third quarter at 60-45, but Capacio and Kenny Redfield, hitting from the three-point arc, led the Hotdogs' comeback to pull abreast at 84-all with 3:30 to go, the Milkmen scored six straight points to erect a 90-84 lead in the last 1:52. Alvin Patrimonio connected with his own trey and Redfield scored on a drive as the Hotdogs close to within a point, 89-90.

Game 5

Glenn Capacio sizzled hot in the fourth quarter, knocking in six straight points to capped an 11-2 Hotdogs' rampage that broke the game wide open at 88-75. Kenny Redfield started the breakaway with a triple from a 77-73 count in the middle of the final period.

Rosters

Broadcast notes

References

External links
PBA official website

1994 PBA season
1994
Alaska Aces (PBA) games
Magnolia Hotshots games
PBA Commissioner's Cup Finals
PBA Commissioner's Cup Finals